Taj Mohammed or Taj Mohammad may refer to:

Taj Mohammed (footballer) (born 1924), Indian footballer
Taj Mohammad Amrothi (1857–1929), Indian Muslim scholar
Taj Mohammad Wardak, Afghan politician
Taj Muhammad Jamali (died 2009), Pakistani politician
Taj Mohammed (Guantanamo Bay detainee), Afghan shepherd, held five years in Guantanamo
Taj Mohammad (Olympic wrestler), competed in the under 70 kg class for Pakistan at the 1968 Summer Olympics